Force One or Force 1 may refer to:

Automobiles
 Force One (sport utility vehicle), a 2011–2016 Indian mid-size SUV
 VLF Force 1, a 2016–present American sports car

Military
 Force One (Mumbai Police), an armed force

See also
 Force (disambiguation)
 One (disambiguation)
 A Force of One, a 1979 American martial-arts film
 Force I (letter-I), a World War II British Royal Navy task force based in Ceylon, see List of task forces of the Royal Navy